Myothyriopsis is a genus of parasitic flies in the family Tachinidae.

Species
Myothyriopsis picta (Wulp, 1890)

Distribution
United States, Trinidad & Tobago, Mexico, Brazil.

References

Diptera of North America
Diptera of South America
Exoristinae
Tachinidae genera
Taxa named by Charles Henry Tyler Townsend
Monotypic Brachycera genera